Direct Aero Services was a charter airline based in Bucharest, Romania. Its main base was Aurel Vlaicu International Airport. In 2012, it changed its name to Romstrade Logistic Expres.

Romstrade Logistic Expres has suspended operations and its air operator certificate has been revoked on 7 March 2013.

Destinations

Fleet
The Direct Aero Services fleet included the following aircraft:

External links

References

Defunct airlines of Romania
Airlines established in 2007
Airlines disestablished in 2013
Defunct charter airlines
Romanian companies established in 2007
2013 disestablishments in Romania